Barla is a former Roman city.

Barla may also refer to:

 British Amateur Rugby League Association, the governing body for social and recreational rugby league in the United Kingdom
 Barla (surname), a surname

See also

 Bârla
 Barlas (disambiguation)